Pleasant Goat and Big Big Wolf: The Super Adventure, is a 2009 Chinese animated children's comedy film directed by Sung Pong Choo and William Kan. The film was released on January 16, 2009, close to the Chinese New Year holiday. It is the first in a series of films based on the popular Pleasant Goat and Big Big Wolf animated television series and is followed by Pleasant Goat and Big Big Wolf: The Tiger Prowess a year later.

With a gross of over ¥80 million, The Super Adventure became the highest-grossing animated Chinese film at the time of its release, overtaking the previous record-holder Storm Rider Clash of the Evils. Its record would soon be surpassed in 2010 by its sequel, The Tiger Prowess.

Plot
They found a sick snail in the goat village. The goats went to its body to rescued it by shrinking them with a miniature spray. They sneaked into the snail to treat it. However, Wolffy knew this plan. In order to catch the goats, he also narrowed himself and sneaked into the snail. After the goats and Wolffy entered the snail's body, they found that the sick snail had a lot of bacteria in it. There was a sensational blast that was divided into white and black. Finally, the goat led the white bacterium. Fighting against the black bacteria led by Wolffy. But there is still a yellow bacterium between them. This yellow bacterium combines the power of black and white bacteria, so it is more powerful, but at the same time, he was quite arrogant, look down on people, so the plot develops to the end, the yellow bacterium becomes the biggest villain in the movie. As for the goat and the wolves, they eventually worked together to deal with this more nasty yellow bacterium.

Voice cast
Zu Liqing – Weslie
Deng Yuting – Tibbie / Jonie / Peng qiaqia
Liang Ying – Paddi / Wilie
Liu Hongyun – Sparky
Gao Quansheng – Slowy
Zhang Lin – Wolffy
Zhao Na – Wolnie
Li Tuan – Randy
Mao Fangyuan 
Chen Zeyu – Dong Dongqiang
Wu Diwen 
Zhong Kai

Release
The film was released on January 16, 2009. Liu Manyi, the general manager of Creative Power Entertaining, said that before the film's release in theaters, pirate discs of the film had already been distributed.

Home media
The Super Adventure was released on DVD in China on 16 February 2009, a month after its theatrical release, with Mandarin and Cantonese dubbing and English subtitles provided. Another edition of the DVD was released on 4 March 2009, providing special features such behind-the-scenes footage and a music video of the film's theme song performed by Malaysian singer Ah Niu. Both DVD editions were produced by the Shanghai Audio & Video Company.

Reception

Box office
Francis Leung, an investment banker quoted in the Wall Street Journal, said the film made 80 million yuan in revenue, setting box office records in regards to Mainland China-produced films. A China Daily article said that the film made 100 million yuan. According to cbooo.cn, the film earned  at the Chinese box office.

Accolades
The Super Adventure won the award for Outstanding Animation at the 13th China Huabiao Film Awards.

References

External links

2009 films
Pleasant Goat and Big Big Wolf films
2000s children's comedy films
2009 animated films
Animated comedy films
Chinese animated films
Chinese children's films
2009 comedy films